Ceratinia cayana is a species of butterfly of the family Nymphalidae. It is found in Brazil, Suriname and the Guianas.

Subspecies
 Ceratinia cayana cayana (Suriname and the Guianas)
 Ceratinia cayana giparanaensis d'Almeida, 1964 (Brazil)

References

Butterflies described in 1869
Ithomiini
Fauna of Brazil
Nymphalidae of South America
Taxa named by Osbert Salvin